The Arabic-language non-political weekly magazine Kull shay (Arabic: كل شىء; DMG: Kull šayʾ; English: Everything) was first published in Cairo in 1925. The magazine produced a total of 105 issues until its closure in 1927. It was published by Dar Al Hilal. The managing editor was the famous journalist, writer and political theorist Salama Musa. He also published editorials in the magazine. One of the contributors was Palestinian writer Asma Tubi. In 1927, the magazine was merged with Al-Alam to form the periodical Kull šayʾ wa-l-ʿālam.

References

1925 establishments in Egypt
1927 disestablishments in Egypt
Arabic-language magazines
Defunct magazines published in Egypt
Magazines established in 1925
Magazines disestablished in 1927
Magazines published in Cairo
Weekly magazines published in Egypt